Paul Harel, born in Échauffour on May 18, 1854 and died on March 7, 1927, was a French poet and innkeeper.

Biography

Early life
Son of a Saint-Lô lawyer, Paul Harel often skipped school and was apprenticed to the pharmacist of Montreuil-l'Argillé at the age of fourteen, where he sold ointments while learning a little Latin from the local priest. From sixteen to nineteen, he was a typographer in Nogent-le-Rotrou, where he prints the works of Paulin Paris, Gaston Paris and Paul Meyer

Théophile Féret said of him: "Since the rhymes of brooch and sword, everyone knows the innkeeper of Échauffour, and since the Memories of inn, he has annexed his great hall to literature Norman. Before Barres, he identified some of the intimate connections between lineage, soil and ancestral worship. He wanted to root us in the homeland. "

In the preface to his first collection, Under the Apple Trees, published in 1879, Paul Harel took care to explain why he embraced the profession of hotelier: "My father was a lawyer, my grandfather innkeeper; I took up the job of this one for the sake of the picturesque. I thought I ought to give this bad example to my contemporaries, at a time when the sons of the earth are deserting their homes, where the life of the ancestors is unknown, if not scorned. If he has not regretted his choice, it is also a little because for him, "the great secret of everything is in charity", and that the ancestral profession allows him to practice this virtue on a large scale by welcoming to his home the poor, the beggars who pass on the road.

Later life
Paul Harel was loved in return. He enjoyed a good reputation in his country. "In the Orne," says Féret, "one bears a religious tenderness to him. "

Paul Harel has sung the charms of nature and rural life with a sincerity and simplicity that exclude neither the picturesque nor the grandeur. In his last volume, which he prefers to others, The Far Hours (1903), he draws his inspiration above all from faith, which he can not conceive without charity. In 1895 he was called to direct, in Paris, a great Catholic magazine, La Quinzaine. But the splendours of the capital could not make him forget his native country: loving rustic simplicity, he soon resigned his directorial functions to return to Echauffour.

Works
 Sous les pommiers, poésies, 1879
 Gousses d'ail et fleurs de serpolet, 1881
 Les Vingt-Huit Jours du caporal Ballandard, 1882
 Rimes de broche et d’épée, 1883
 Aux champs, 1886
 Gustave Le Vavasseur, 1888
 La Hanterie, 1889
 Souvenirs d’auberge, 1894
 Gorgeansac. La Petite Marthe. Le Nez du cousin Barnabé, 1898
 À l’Enseigne du Grand-Saint-André, 1906
 Ernest Millet, 1904
 La Vie et le mystère ; sonnets, 1921
 Les Larmes, 1895
 Les Voix de la glèbe, 1895
 Les Voix de la glèbe, 1895
 Œuvres choisies, 1897
 Le Demi-sang, roman, 1898
 Les Heures lointaines, 1902
 Ernest Millet, 1904
 Œuvres : Heures lointaines. Aux champs. Voix de la glèbe. Poèmes inédits, 1904
 En forêt, 1906
 Hobereaux et villageois, 1911
 Mme de La Galaisière, 1913
 Poèmes mystiques et champêtres, 1914
 Devant les morts, poèmes de guerre, 1918
 La Vie et le Mystère, sonnets, 1921
 Poèmes à la gloire du Christ, suivis de poésies diverses, 1928
 Poèmes mystiques et champêtres, 1914
 La Marquise de Fleuré, 1923
 L'Herbager, pièce en 3 actes, en vers, Paris, Théâtre de l'Odéon, 19 septembre 1891 (Theater)

References

1854 births
1927 deaths
French poets